Promenade Concert is a Canadian music television series which aired on CBC Television from 1953 to 1956.

Premise
This series featured the Promenade Concert series in Toronto, recorded at Varsity Arena. These concerts were also broadcast on CBC Radio.

Scheduling
This hour-long series was broadcast as follows (times in Eastern):

References

External links
 

CBC Television original programming
1950s Canadian music television series
1953 Canadian television series debuts
1956 Canadian television series endings
Black-and-white Canadian television shows